Weberstown Mall is one of two shopping malls in Stockton, California. It is next to Sherwood Mall. Opened in 1966, it is anchored by J. C. Penney, Sears, Dillard's and  Barnes & Noble.

Also features Pink, Old Navy, Forever 21, H&M, and more. It is owned and managed by Washington Prime Group.

History
Charles M. Weber III built Weberstown Mall in 1966. The original anchors were Sears and Weinstock's.

Old Navy opened one of its first locations at the mall in 1995, taking over a spot vacated by Pier One Imports. In 1996, the Weinstock's store closed. Two years later, it was purchased by Dillard's to become that chain's first California location. Barnes & Noble moved into the mall in 1997, replacing a store nearby. A year later, Glimcher Realty Trust purchased the mall.

The mall's J. C. Penney store was slated for closure in 2000, but the decision to close was later overturned.

References

External links
Weberstown Mall

Shopping malls in California
Shopping malls established in 1966
Buildings and structures in Stockton, California
Washington Prime Group